Tor kulkarnii (common name: dwarf mahseer) is a species of cyprinid of the genus Tor. It is classified as "data deficient" on the IUCN Red List and is considered harmless to humans.

References

Cyprinidae
Cyprinid fish of Asia
Freshwater fish of India
Fish described in 1992
IUCN Red List data deficient species